The FIM Bajas World Cup is the premier championship of baja-style rally raid racing, organized by the Fédération Internationale de Motocyclisme (FIM) since  2012. Along with the main world cup for 450cc, there are world cups for the following categories: Quads, Women, and Junior. Unlike the much longer cross-country rallies, cross-country bajas generally take place in 2–3 days. As is the case with rally raid events the stages are long and arduous testing the skill and endurance of the riders. 

The FIM Cross-Country Rallies World Championship was the premier championship for the longer cross-country rallies. From the 2022 season, the Bajas World Cup runs alongside the World Rally-Raid Championship together with the FIA World Cup for Cross Country Bajas.

Winners

References

External links
 

 
Motorcycle off-road racing series
Fédération Internationale de Motocyclisme
Recurring sporting events established in 1999